The 1903 New Zealand tour rugby to Australia was the fourth tour by the New Zealand national team to Australia. Nine matches were played against regional and district sides along with one test match between the two national sides, the first played by New Zealand in their history.

On 11 July, New Zealand played a preliminary match v. the Wellington Rugby Football Union at Athletic Park, won by the local team by 14–5.

Touring party
Manager: A.C. Norris
Captain: Jimmy Duncan

Match summary
Complete list of matches played by New Zealand in Australia: 

 Test matches

Test match

See also
 List of All Blacks tours and series

References 

New Zealand
New Zealand tour
Tour
New Zealand national rugby union team tours of Australia